Buragohain (Ahom language: Chao Phrung Mung) was the first of the two original counsellors in the Ahom kingdom.  He was selected by the Ahom king from members of the Ahom nobility (Satgharia Ahom),who vowed not to fight for the position of Ahom kingship, rather act as a guide to the Ahom king in matters of administering his province in an efficient manner (King Maker). The other original counsellor is Chao Thao Lung or Borgohain.  Both the positions existed from the time of the first Ahom king, Sukaphaa. 

During the rule of Suhungmung, the Burhagohain was given the Dihing province (the region north of the Dikhow river up to Tinsukia) to administer. Later, he was made in-charge of the region between Sadiya province and Gereluwa river (Dikrong) on the north bank of the Brahmaputra, as Borbarua was given the charge of territories between Sadiya province to Kaliabor on the south bank.

List of Burhagohain
 Thao Mong Klin Man Rai
 Thao-Ru-Ru
 Thao Phrang Dam
 Khen-Pong
 Phun-Long-Kham-Peng
 Thao-Mong-Chang-Rai
 Thao-Mong-Nang-Dhu-Pu-Ra
 Lajan Chao-Phrang-Dam
 Lapet Chao-Phran-Dam
 ... 
 Aikhek Burhagohain
 Chaopet Burhagohain
 Thakbak Burhagohain
 Sukulahuda Burhagohain
 Sariah Burhagohain
 Hatipoali Burhagohain
 Lasham Burhagohain
 Atan Burhagohain
 Dilihiyal Langi Burhagohain
 Kunwoiganya Mau Burhagohain
 Lankakia Khampeng Burhagohain
 Kunwoiganya Laisheng Burhagohain
 Dilihiliyal Aphau Khampet Burhagohain
 Bailung Bayan Burhagohain
 Domai Burhagohain
 Sengmun Burhagohain
 Bailungia Sonai Burhagohain
 Langmai Kalia Burhagohain
 Kunwoigayan Bhagi Burhagohain
 ... 
 Ghanashyam Burhagohain (Kunwoigayan family)
 Purnanada Burhagohain alias Mahidhara
 Ruchinath Burhagohain
 ...

Bibliography

References

 Assamese-language surnames